The Men's Allam British Open 2013 is the men's edition of the 2013 British Open Squash Championships, which is a PSA World Series event Platinum (Prize money : 150,000 $). The event took place at the KC Stadium in Hull in England from 20 to 26 May. Ramy Ashour won his first British Open trophy, beating Grégory Gaultier in the final.

Prize money and ranking points
For 2013, the prize purse was $150,000. The prize money and points breakdown is as follows:

Seeds

Draw and results

See also
2013 Men's World Open Squash Championship
2013 Women's British Open Squash Championship

References

External links
PSA British Open 2013 website
British Open 2013 official website 

Men's British Open Squash Championships
Men's British Open
Men's British Open
Men's British Open Squash
Squash in England
Men's sport in the United Kingdom
Sport in Kingston upon Hull
2010s in Kingston upon Hull